Dominique Paravel (born 1955) is a French writer.

Works 
2011: Nouvelles vénitiennes,  publisher,   — prix Thyde Monnier of the Société des gens de lettres, prix de la Nouvelle de la Femme Renard Lauzerte, prix du 1er recueil de nouvelles lors de la Fête de la nouvelle au château de Chamerolles.
2013: Uniques, Serge Safran publisher,  
2016: Giratoire, Serge Safran publisher,   — prix Cazes / brasserie Lipp.

References

External links 
 Dominique Paravel on Babelio
 Dominique Paravel - Uniques on YouTube
 "Uniques" le premier roman social et poétique de Dominique Paravel on France Info

21st-century French non-fiction writers
French women novelists
1955 births
Living people
21st-century French women writers